Pandippuzha (പാണ്ടിപ്പുഴ) is a tributary of Chaliyar. It is a small river originating from the forests north-west of Thannikkadavu. The river flows through Kodalippoyil to Edakkara and Chungathara panchayaths before joining with Chaliyar at Kaippini. Pandippuzha-Chaliyar belt is known for its gold deposits.

Rivers of Malappuram district